Per Ciljan Skjelbred (born 16 June 1987) is a Norwegian footballer who currently plays as a midfielder for Rosenborg. He has previously played for Hertha Berlin and Hamburger SV, and has been capped 43 times playing for Norway, but as of 2017, retired from international football.

Club career

Skjelbred was born in Trondheim and started his career at local football club Trygg/Lade. He made an impression, and was selected to compete in a football talent competition entitled Proffdrømmen ("Pro player dreams") on Norwegian TV3. Skjelbred won this competition and as first prize, he got a week's training with Liverpool. The English club offered him a contract for their youth team, but he declined. 

Instead, he went to hometown club Rosenborg, where he soon came into first-team reckoning. Skjelbred made his senior debut in the Tippeligaen against Bodø/Glimt in 2004, and aged 16 years and 358 days became the second-youngest player to play for Rosenborg.

After scoring a goal in the first match of the 2005 Champions League against Olympiacos, he was tackled in the return match at Lerkendal on 23 November by Ieroklis Stoltidis; both bones in Skjelbred's lower leg snapped just above the ankle. Although he went in with both legs and had no chance of getting the ball, Stoltidis said he had not meant to harm Skjelbred. Skjelbred returned to football on 10 March 2006 in Rosenborg BK's match against Aalesunds FK, playing the first half of the match which Rosenborg won 5–1.

Skjelbred joined the German side Hamburger SV in August 2011. After playing 268 minutes for the club in the Bundesliga, Skjelbred's transfer was called a "mistake" (Bisher Fehlgriff) by Kicker in November 2011, and in November 2012 Skjelbred was named one of five players that HSV stated they would sell when the transfer window opened in January 2013.

However, after the 2013 January transfer window closed, Skjelbred remained a Hamburg player. In the summer of 2013, he was loaned for one season to Hertha BSC, who in turn loaned Pierre-Michel Lasogga to Hamburg.

After a very successful loan spell at Hertha (he was also voted Bundesliga Norwegian Player of the Season during this time), Skjelbred finally moved to Berlin permanently during the 2014 Summer transfer window.

In February 2020, Skjelbred confirmed he would return to Rosenborg beginning from the summer 2020 after his contract with Hertha Berlin expires.

International career
Skjelbred was first called up for the Norwegian under-21 team in September 2005, at the age of 18. He made his debut for senior team against Malta on 28 March 2007.

On 3 September 2014 Skjelbred captained the Norwegian national side for the first time against England at Wembley. 
England won the match 1-0 thanks to a Wayne Rooney penalty. Per was handed the captain's armband after previous captain, Brede Hangeland retired from international football.

On 22 February 2017 Skjelbred retired from the national team.

International goals
Score and Result lists Norway's goals first

Personal life
Skjelbred married Kristina Jørgensen in October 2012. Together they have two children Eline Sofie and Jonathan.

Career statistics
Statistics accurate as of 19 March 2023

Continental competition includes UEFA Intertoto Cup, UEFA Cup/UEFA Europa League, and UEFA Champions League matches, as well as qualification matches.

Honours

Rosenborg
Tippeligaen: 2006, 2009, 2010
Superfinalen: 2010
UEFA Intertoto Cup: 2008

Notes

References

External links
 
 

1987 births
Living people
Footballers from Trondheim
Association football midfielders
Norwegian footballers
Norway international footballers
Norwegian expatriate footballers
Rosenborg BK players
Hamburger SV players
Eliteserien players
Bundesliga players
Expatriate footballers in Germany
Hertha BSC players